Pierre Kremer (born 4 February 1900, date of death unknown) was a Luxembourgian footballer. He played in eight matches for the Luxembourg national football team between 1927 and 1931.

References

External links

1900 births
Year of death missing
Luxembourgian footballers
Luxembourg international footballers
Place of birth missing
Association football midfielders
FA Red Boys Differdange players
Olympic footballers of Luxembourg
Footballers at the 1924 Summer Olympics